Milen Manoj Earath (born 18 October 2001) is an Indian pianist who is the youngest Indian to complete grades 1-8 (in 1.5 years), ATCL, LTCL with distinction and FTCL in piano by the age of 14 at Trinity College London. In 2016, he was awarded the National Child Award by Pranab Mukherjee, the President of India, for exceptional achievements in the field of music. Earath has performed in India, Germany, Russia, Belgium and Italy.

Early life
Born in the southern Indian state of Kerala, Earath comes from a family with no musical background. His father Manoj Bhaskaran Earath, an Indian national and mother Alena Vladimirovna Earath, a Russian national, are both doctors.

During his childhood, he was interested in sports, kung-fu, and other extra-curricular activities, especially at school. Earath excelled in academics, winning prizes in recitation, elocution and storytelling in primary school.

Education
Earath's introduction to the world of classical piano music happened during his 3rd grade school vacation, while he visited his grandparents in Russia. They took him to a concert at a music school nearby where he first saw and heard a grand piano.  He went for piano lessons in that music school for the next two weeks, during which he learnt to play Beethoven's Für Elise and Marmot.

It was after the school vacation that Earath joined a music school in his hometown, Thrissur on June 1, 2010.

In May 2011, Earath started Initial Grade Piano of Trinity College, London. In a span of 1.5 years, by December 2012, he had completed the 8 grades in Pianoforte with distinction. He appeared for Associate of Trinity College, London (ATCL, equivalent in level to the first year of an undergraduate degree) in December 2013 and passed the exam with distinction. In December 2014, he passed Licentiate of Trinity College, London (LTCL, corresponding in level to the final year of an undergraduate degree) with distinction. In January 2015, Earath was certified with Fellowship of Trinity College, London (FTCL, corresponding to a postgraduate course at a conservatoire or university)  in Piano Performance. The time of 4.5 years taken by Earath, who is also the youngest Indian to do so, for completing the 8 grades and the 3 diplomas of Trinity College, London is considered to be one of the shortest.

Earath has attended many intensive piano masterclasses with Koch since 2014, for which he traveled to Germany for short periods. While in India, Earath continued his work mostly by himself and through occasional Skype classes.

Currently, Earath is pursuing his studies in piano performance with Prof.  at Gnessin Russian Academy of Music

Career
Earath's first exposure to a piano competition was at age 12 in the 2013 MusiQuest, an all-India piano competition in Pune. He won first place in the advanced division for ages up to 25, winning an acoustic piano and a scholarship for a summer camp in the International Institute for Young Musicians in Kansas.

In 2014, he was a semi-finalist and the winner of the "Audience Favorite Prize" at "Conbrio" Mumbai, a national level piano competition for ages up to 35.

On January 24, 2016, Earath had his first solo recital, which was held at Schloss Burgau, Germany. His orchestral debut took place in Germany on October 16, 2016, where he performed Mendelssohn's Piano Concerto No. 1 in G minor.

Starting in 2014, Earath had multiple concerts in Germany, Russia, Belgium and Italy.

Earath was awarded the  National Child Award for Exceptional Achievements in the Field of Music by President of India Shri. Pranab Mukherjee on November 14, 2016, at Rashtrapati Bhavan.

His first large-scale solo recital in India was held on April 28, 2017 at the National Centre for Performing Arts in Mumbai.

In July 2017, Earath was awarded Best Child Musician (Male) at the Indywood Film Carnival.

On November 10, 2017, Earath performed for Queen Mathilde of Belgium, at the Mehli Mehta Music Foundation.

On February 3, 2018, Earath performed Liszt's Piano Concerto No. 2 accompanied by Collegium Musicum Jülich, with conductor Peter Sauerwein at the Gymnasium Zitadelle in Jülich.

References

Living people
2001 births
Indian pianists
21st-century Indian musicians